Lasse Stefanz på Svensktoppen was released in 1998 and is an album from Swedish "dansband" Lasse Stefanz. The songs on the album are Lasse Stefanz songs charting at Svensktoppen.

Track listing
De sista ljuva åren
Oklahoma
Av hela mitt hjärta
Jag kommer hem igen
En gång är ingen gång
Mot nya mål
Dig ska jag älska
Du försvann som en vind
Nere på söder
En enkel sång om kärleken
Jag väntat många dagar
Visst är det kärlek
Du kan tro på mitt ord
Midsommarafton

References 

 

1998 compilation albums
Compilation albums by Swedish artists
Lasse Stefanz albums